Gmina Żmudź is a rural gmina (administrative district) in Chełm County, Lublin Voivodeship, in eastern Poland.

Villages
Gmina Żmudź contains the villages and settlements of Annopol, Bielin, Dębinki, Dryszczów, Gałęzów, Kazimierówka, Klesztów, Kolonia, Ksawerów, Leszczany, Leszczany-Kolonia, Lipinki, Majdan, Maziarnia, Pacówka, Pobołowice, Pobołowice-Kolonia, Poczekajka, Podlaski, Poręb, Puszcza, Roztoka, Roztoka-Kolonia, Rudno, Stanisławów, Stara Wieś, Syczów, Teresin, Wólka Leszczańska, Wołkowiany, Żmudź and Żmudź-Kolonia.

Neighbouring gminas
Gmina Żmudź is bordered by the gminas of Białopole, Dorohusk, Dubienka, Kamień, Leśniowice and Wojsławice.

References
 Polish official population figures 2006

Zmudz
Chełm County